Herrán is a surname. Notable people with the surname include:

 Eduardo Barriobero y Herrán (1875 – 1939), Spanish lawyer and activist 
 Joaquín Leguina Herrán (born 1941), Spanish politician and writer
 Miguel Herrán (born 1996), Spanish actor
 Pedro Alcántara Herrán (1800 – 1872), President of the Republic of New Granada
Saturnino Herrán (1887 – 1918), Mexican Painter
Tomás Herrán (1834 – 1904), Colombian diplomat